Wuhu (539) is a Type 054A frigate of the People's Liberation Army Navy. She was commissioned on 29 June 2017.

Development and design 

The Type 054A carries HQ-16 medium-range air defence missiles and anti-submarine missiles in a vertical launching system (VLS) system. The HQ-16 has a range of up to 50 km, with superior range and engagement angles to the Type 054's HQ-7. The Type 054A's VLS uses a hot launch method; a shared common exhaust system is sited between the two rows of rectangular launching tubes.

The four AK-630 close-in weapon systems (CIWS) of the Type 054 were replaced with two Type 730 CIWS on the Type 054A. The autonomous Type 730 provides improved reaction time against close-in threats.

Construction and career 
Wuhu was launched on 8 June 2016 at the Hudong–Zhonghua Shipbuilding in Shanghai. Commissioned on 29 June 2017.

On 17 January 2019, Dongpinghu, Wuhu and Handan made a goodwill visit to Manila.

Gallery

References 

2016 ships
Ships built in China
Type 054 frigates